Yingde West railway station is a high-speed railway station. It is located in Yingde,  Qingyuan, Guangdong Province, China. The station opened on 1 April 2012.

References

Railway stations in Guangdong
Railway stations in China opened in 2012